Konkola Blades is a Zambian professional football club based in Chililabombwe, that competes in the Zambian Premier League. They play their home games at the 20,000-capacity Konkola Stadium in Chililabombwe.

Achievements
 Zambian Cup:
1983, 1998

 Zambian Division One North:
2005

References

Football clubs in Zambia
Association football clubs established in 1956
1956 establishments in Northern Rhodesia